Ooi Shee Keong is a Malaysian footballer who last played for T-Team. He plays as a winger. He is of Chindian descent.

Club career

T-Team
On 7 June 2017, Shee Keong signed a contract with T-Team.

Career statistics
As of 28 October 2017.

Honours

MISC-MIFA
FAM League
 Winners (1): 2016

References

External links 
 

Malaysian footballers
1991 births
Living people
Terengganu F.C. II  players
People from Penang
Malaysian people of Chinese descent
Malaysian people of Indian descent
MISC-MIFA players
Association football defenders